Frank J. Esposito (March 24, 1928 – January 9, 2013) was the mayor of Norwalk, Connecticut for seven terms, from 1987 to 2001, the longest-serving mayor in the city's history. He also served four terms from 1981 to 1987 in the Connecticut House of Representatives, including as Assistant Majority Leader and Minority Leader.

Early life and family 
He was born in Bronx, New York, the fourth of five children of Frank R. Esposito and Mary Zecola Esposito. At the age of 12, he moved to Norwalk with his family and graduated from Norwalk High School in 1946 where he was an accomplished football player. He was married to Louise Stroffolino, the niece of State Senator Stanley Stroffolino, on January 27, 1951.

Esposito served in the U.S. Army during the Korean War as a sergeant 1st class. After being discharged, he learned about radio and television engineering at the RCA Institute in New York. He worked for a time at the DuMont Television Network, and was the owner of a grocery store and delicatessen in Norwalk for over 25 years.

Political career 
Esposito began his political career in 1970, as an appointed member of the Norwalk Housing Authority. He then was elected to two terms on Norwalk's Common Council. He served four terms from 1981 to 1987 in the Connecticut House of Representatives, representing Connecticut's 137th assembly district, including as Assistant Majority Leader and Minority Leader. In 1987, Esposito resigned from the legislature to run for mayor of Norwalk.

Mayoral administration 
Esposito's seven terms from 1987 to 2001 was the longest mayoral administration in the city's history. His accomplishments as mayor included building a parking garage for rail commuters, raising the city's bond rating to the top AAA, leading the effort for a $50 million upgrade to Norwalk's sewage treatment plant, moving the Department of Public Work's garage from Matthews Park to make room for a children's museum and playground, designating a new site for the Norwalk Police Department, closing the conspicuously visible city dump, and supporting the creation of The Maritime Aquarium at a time when it wasn't that popular.

Death 
He died on January 9, 2013, of cancer, and he was buried at St. John's Cemetery in Norwalk.

References 

1928 births
2013 deaths
American grocers
Burials in Saint John's Cemetery (Norwalk, Connecticut)
Deaths from cancer in Connecticut
Connecticut city council members
Mayors of Norwalk, Connecticut
Republican Party members of the Connecticut House of Representatives
Politicians from the Bronx
United States Army personnel of the Korean War
United States Army soldiers
Norwalk High School (Connecticut) alumni